Benjamin Antonietti (born 7 July 1991) is a Swiss professional ice hockey player who is currently playing with Genève-Servette HC of the National League (NL). He previously played in the NL with Lausanne HC and the Dragons de Rouen of the French league.

Playing career
Antonietti made his National League A debut playing with Genève-Servette HC during the 2009–10 NLA season.

After a rather unsuccessful 2016–17 season with Lausanne where he tallied only 8 points in 42 games, he was a healthy scratch for most of the 2017 playoffs. At the end of the season, Lausanne decided not to offer him any contract extension, allowing him to agree to a one-year deal with the Dragons de Rouen of the French Ligue Magnus. On 5 January 2018 Antonietti decided to leave the rather weak Ligue Magnus after having tallied 35 points (12 goals) in 31 games, a career-high for him in a single season, even though he did not play a full season in Rouen. This allowed him to join back Lausanne HC and played his first game of the season on 6 January 2018 against EHC Kloten, failing to score a single point.

On 19 April 2018 Antonietti agreed to a two-year contract extension with Lausanne HC worth CHF 900,000. On 18 April 2020 Antonietti was signed to a one-year contract extension by Lausanne HC.

On 3 February 2021 it was announced that Antonietti would return to Genève-Servette for the 2021–22 season, joining the team on a two-year deal.

Personal life
He is the older brother of EHC Olten defenseman, Eliot Antonietti.

References

External links

1991 births
Living people
EHC Basel players
Dragons de Rouen players
Genève-Servette HC players
Lausanne HC players
Swiss ice hockey left wingers
People from Orbe
Sportspeople from the canton of Vaud